Sorana Paula Păcurar, known professionally as Sorana Păcurar or Sorana, is a Romanian singer and songwriter. Upon taking part in X Factor Romania, acting in the Romanian soap opera O nouă viață (A New Life) and being part of the Romanian group Lala Band, Sorana released her first single "Povești" ("Stories") in 2015 under Marius Moga's label DeMoga Music. She then left her native country to further pursue a musical career and relocated to London and then Los Angeles. Her portfolio as a songwriter includes the commercially successful songs "Takeaway" (2019) by the Chainsmokers, Illenium and Lennon Stella, "OMG What's Happening" (2020) by Ava Max, and "Heartbreak Anthem" (2021) by Galantis, David Guetta and Little Mix. Furthermore, Sorana has also collaborated with artists such as Alan Walker on "Lost Control" (2018). In 2022, she released her debut single under Atlantic Records, "Redrum" with David Guetta.

Discography

As lead artist

As featured artist

Other charted songs

Songwriting credits

Notes

References

External links 
 

Living people
English-language singers from Romania
Romanian dance musicians
Romanian electronic musicians
Romanian women pop singers
Romanian women singers
Atlantic Records artists
Year of birth missing (living people)